Oscar Branzani (born 13 November 1989) is an Italian professional footballer who plays for Italian Serie C club Barletta.

Biography

Giacomense
Born in Naples, Campania, Branzani started his senior career at Emilian club Giacomense. He played 4 times in 2007–08 Serie D. The club won promotion in 2008, to professional league Lega Pro Seconda Divisione (ex–Serie C2). Branzani received call-up to Italy under-20 "C" team in 2009.

Taranto
In 2010, he was signed by Lega Pro Prima Divisione (ex–Serie C1) club Taranto.

Cittadella
On 8 July 2011 he was signed by Serie B club Sampdoria for around €550,000, but farmed to fellow second division club Cittadella in co-ownership deal for €275,000. In June 2012 the co-ownership was renewed. On 31 January 2013 Branzani left for Andria. In June 2013 Sampdoria gave up the remain 50% registration rights to Cittadella for free.

Barletta
On 10 August 2013 Branzani left for Italian third division club Barletta in new co-ownership deal; Alessandro De Leidi left for Cittadella in the same formula from Barletta. The club finished as the 14th of Group B (17 teams in total). However, due to the two divisions of Lega Pro (ex–Serie C) would be merged back to one division in 2014, the club automatically qualified for the professional league in 2014–15 season.

Honours
 Serie D: 2008 (Giacomense)

References

External links
 Lega Serie B profile 
 AIC profile (data by football.it) 

Italian footballers
S.S.C. Giugliano players
A.C. Giacomense players
Taranto F.C. 1927 players
A.S. Cittadella players
S.S. Fidelis Andria 1928 players
A.S.D. Barletta 1922 players
Serie B players
Serie C players
Association football midfielders
Footballers from Naples
1989 births
Living people